Endell is a surname. Notable people with the surname include:
August Endell (1871–1925), German designer, writer, teacher and German Jugendstil architect

See also 
Charles Endell Esquire, British comedy-drama
Endell Street, Street in London's West End
Endell Street Military Hospital, First World War military hospital located on Endell Street in Covent Garden, London